Silver Hill Hospital is a non-profit psychiatric hospital in New Canaan, Connecticut established in 1931. The hospital is accredited by the Joint Commission and provides behavioral health care treatment. This includes psychiatric and addiction services. 

From 2010 to 2018, Silver Hill Hospital hosted the annual Giving Hope Gala, a fundraiser to benefit the Patient Financial Aid Fund, which assists patients lacking funds to cover the costs for the hospital's long-term residential treatment programs. The gala was founded by Michael Cominotto and husband Dennis Basso.

History
Silver Hill Hospital was founded by John Millet in 1931 as Silver Hill Inn as a setting to help patients described as "nervous, depressed, anxious, or malingering." It was located in the Silvermine River Valley of Fairfield County, straddling the borders of Wilton and New Canaan, Connecticut.

Starting in 1971, focus was placed on building the hospital's substance abuse program. By 1984, that program included a psychiatrist, an associate psychiatrist, a psychologist, substance abuse counselors, nursing staff, and a recreational and occupational therapist.''

The inpatient acute care unit was built in 1985 to provide treatment to patients whose mental illness call for constant supervision.

In 2012, The Chronic Pain and Recovery Center program launched. In 2015, both an eating disorder program for adults and an outpatient opioid addiction program launched.

Facilities
The hospital's 42-acre campus includes former family homes acquired by the hospital's board over time, allowing for longer-term treatment and transitional living programs on the campus. The restoration of these homes generated several awards from a local historical preservation society. These include:
 Scavetta House, which serves as a men's residential facility. 
 River House, a 1913 English Tudor style home that has served as a patient residence since the 1980s and now houses the Dialectical Behavior Therapy residential program, which helps patients diagnosed with Borderline Personality Disorder regulate feelings by charting emotions.
 Klingenstein House, a 1920s guesthouse that now houses the Adolescent Transitional Living Program.

References

External links
 Silver Hill Hospital website

Hospital buildings completed in 1931
Psychiatric hospitals in Connecticut
Buildings and structures in New Canaan, Connecticut
Hospitals established in 1931